

Auditions and Show Summary 
The preliminary rounds took place at E. L. Senanayake premises, Kandy on 30, 31 October and 1 November; at Mahinda College, Galle on 11 and 12 November and at Stein Studios on 24, 25 November and  26.

Throughout the show, the contestants should perform in front of the judges. Audition round held in January 2018 and semifinals were chosen by the judge board. Public was able to vote only in the finals. The first television premier started on 18 March 2018 at 9 p.m.

Three golden buzzer acts were chosen straightly to the live shows by each member of the judge panel. Jackson Anthony pressed the golden buzzer for the fire dance act by Nipuni Sithara. Tillakaratne Dilshan pressed the golden buzzer for traditional Angampora dance act by the Sri Lanka Air Force. Musician N.S. Wageshan won the golden buzzer from judge Soundarie David Rodrigo.

After auditions, the judges further deliberated to reduce the number of contestants who passed the auditions to 56, which included 3 golden buzzer acts. 50 contestants were initially chosen for the quarterfinals and 3 wild card acts were later selected by the judges. This session was similar to 'judge cuts' and 'deliberation rounds' held in other got talent franchises. Some acts were required to perform again in order to be confidently chosen for the quarterfinals.

The winner of the show will be awarded Rs 10 million 

Quarterfinals aired from 17 June 2018 and was at Stein Studios, Colombo. 7 acts participated in each quarterfinal where 3 contestants chosen by the judge board moved onto the semifinals. The top 24 contestants participated in the semifinals, which aired from 12 August 2018. In each semifinal, 6 acts participated, where one act was selected by the judge board to advance to the pre finals immediately and the other 2 acts advanced based upon public vote.
Lahiru Perera acted as a guest judge in semifinals 1 where Jackson Anthony's golden buzzer act, Nipuni Sithara won the judges' decision to immediately advance to the pre-finals. The guest judge in semifinals 2 was Dilhani Ekanayake and Tillakaratne Dilshan's golden buzzer act, Angampora pool of the Sri Lanka Air Force won the judges' decision to advance to the pre finals immediately. Circus acrobat M.G. Suminda won the judges' decision in semifinals 3, where Bathiya Jayakody of music duo Bathiya and Santhush acted as the guest judge. Rubic Cube Solver, Osindu Nayanajith won the judges' decision in semifinals 4. Pubudu Chathuranga acted as the guest judge in this semifinal.

The Pre Finale round consisted of two episodes where six acts participated in each episode. At the end of the second episode, the judge board chose six acts to advance into the Grand Finale. Pre Finals was held on 9 & 16 September 2018.

The Grand Finale was held on 30 September 2018 live from Stein Studios of Sirasa TV. Angampora Pool of the Sri Lanka Air Force won the show  where fast mental arithmetic act, Nimna Hiranya was the runner up. Fire dance act Nipuni Sithara received the 2nd Runner-up in the competition.

Top 56 Acts

Quarter Finals Summary

Quarter Finals 1(17 June)

Quarter Finals 2(24 June)

Quarter Finals 3(1 July) 

 Even though the judge board have to send three contestants to the next round, the judge's denied this decision and eliminated all acts in this quarterfinal saying that they were not satisfied with their performances unlike in the acts of the previous two quarterfinals.

Quarter Finals 4(8 July) 

 The judge board chose a 4th act in this quarterfinal to fill the missing spots in the semifinal due to elimination of all contestants in the 3rd quarterfinals.

Quarter Finals 5(15 July)

Quarter Finals 6(22 July)

Quarter Finals 7(29 July) 

 The judge board chose 4 contestants in this round to advance to the semifinals in order to fill the vacant three spots due to all contestants being eliminated in 3.

Quarter Finals 8(5 August) 

 The judge board chose 4 contestants in this round to advance to the semifinals in order to fill the vacant three spots due to all contestants being eliminated in 3.

Semi Finals Summary 
In each Semifinal, 6 acts participated, where one act immediately advanced to the finals based upon judge board decision. Two more acts advanced to the finals based upon public vote.

Semi Finals 1(12 August) 
Lahiru Perera acted as a guest judge in this semifinal. Nipuni Sithara won the judges decision to advance immediately to the pre final round of the competition.

Semi Finals 2(19 August) 
Dilhani Ekanayake acted as a guest judge in this semifinal. Angampora pool won the judge's decision in this semifinals to immediately advance to the Pre Finals.

Semi Finals 3(26 August) 
Bathiya Jayakody acted as a guest judge in this semifinal. The Judges' decision was won by M.G. Suminda to immediately advance to the Pre-final round.

Semi Finals 4(2 September) 
Pubudu Chathuranga acted as a guest judge in this semifinal. The Judges' decision was won by Osindu Nayanajith to immediately advance to the Pre-final round.

Pre Finals (Top 12)
The twelve acts which advanced from the Semifinals competed against each other to advance to the Grand Finale. In each episode six acts participated. After all twelve acts have showcased their performance, the judge board chose six contestants to advance into the Grand Finale (Top 6).

None of the acts were buzzed in both episodes.

Pre Finals episode 1(9 September)

Pre Finals episode 1(16 September)

Pre-Finals Summary

Grand Finale
The Live Grand Finale was held on 30 September 2018. The 6 acts which advanced competed against each other to win the title. No acts were buzzed in the Grand Finale. The acts were given a score of 50% from the judge board and 50% from the public vote.

Bottom 3

Top 3

References 

Non-British television series based on British television series
Sri Lankan television shows